This is the discography of the Philippine Rock band Chicosci.

Albums

Compilation albums
 BEST (2007)

Singles

Music videos

References

Discographies of Filipino artists
Punk rock group discographies